Jai Devaa is an unreleased Indian Hindi-language film directed by Lawrence D'Souza, starring  Sanjay Dutt, Madhuri Dixit and Mithun Chakraborty.

The film was expected to get released in 1993.

Plot

Jai Devaa is a violent triangular love story.

Cast

Mithun Chakraborty
Sanjay Dutt
Madhuri Dixit
Danny Denzongpa
Laxmikant Berde

Trivia

Jai Devaa never graced the theatres even though the talkie portion was completed.

Soundtrack

References

1993 films
1990s Hindi-language films
Unreleased Hindi-language films
Films directed by Lawrence D'Souza